Hsipaw, also known as Thibaw, was a Shan state in what is today Myanmar. Its capital was Hsipaw town. Hsipaw State was perhaps one of the most well known and powerful Shan States.

History
A predecessor state named Duṭṭhavatī was said to be founded in 58 BC, according to local tradition. 

During the Sino-Burmese War (1765–69) the Qianlong Emperor of China invaded the area of Hsipaw. The main Chinese army, led by Ming Rui, was to approach Ava through Hsenwi, Lashio and Hsipaw down the Namtu river. The main invasion route was the same route followed by the Manchu forces a century earlier, chasing the Yongli Emperor of the Southern Ming dynasty. The second army, led by Gen. E'erdeng'e, was to try the Bhamo route again. The ultimate objective was for both armies to clamp themselves in a pincer action on the Burmese capital of Ava. The Burmese plan was to hold the second Chinese army in the north at Kaungton with the army led by Ne Myo Sithu, and meet the main Chinese army in the northeast with two armies led by Maha Sithu and Maha Thiha Thura.

At first, everything went according to plan for the Qing. The third invasion began in November 1767 as the smaller Chinese army attacked and occupied Bhamo. Within eight days, Ming Rui's main army occupied the Shan states of Hsenwi and Hsipaw. Ming Rui made Hsenwi a supply base, and assigned 5000 troops to remain at Hsenwi and guard the rear. He then led a 15,000-strong army in the direction of Ava. In late December, at the Goteik Gorge (south of Hsipaw), the two main armies faced off and the first major battle of the third invasion ensued. Outnumbered two-to-one, Maha Sithu's main Burmese army was thoroughly routed by Ming Rui's Bannermen. Maha Thiha Thura too was repulsed at Hsenwi. The news of the disaster at Goteik reached Ava. Hsinbyushin finally realized the gravity of the situation, and urgently recalled Burmese armies from Siam.

Having smashed through the main Burmese army, Ming Rui pressed on full steam ahead, overrunning one town after another, and reached Singu on the Irrawaddy, 30 miles north of Ava at the beginning of 1768. The only bright spot for the Burmese was that the northern invasion force, which was to come down the Irrawaddy to join up with Ming Rui's main army, had been held off at Kaungton.
 
In 1886 the saopha of Hsipaw was the first Shan prince that submitted to British rule in Burma, which led to Hsipaw becoming a British protectorate in 1887. According to the biography of Sao Nang Hearn Hkam (the chief wife, Madhidevi of Sao Shwe Thaik, the first president of Myanmar and another saopha of Hsenwi), Hsipaw, along with Kengtung and Yawnghwe were the wealthiest and most powerful saopha states in Shan State. 

Between 1938 and 1947 Hsipaw was administered by British Burma. The last ruler of the On Baung dynasty that had been ruling Hsipaw abdicated in 1959. The state became part of Shan State and, despite the independence struggle of the latter, eventually part of Burma.

The saophas played fluctuating roles in regional Shan and national Burmese politics from the 11th century all the way until the 1962 military coup by General Ne Win when all the privileges of the saophas were abolished.

Rulers
The Princes of Hsipaw had the title of 'Saopha'.

Hsipaw (Thibaw)
Founded, according to legend, in 58 BC, it was ruled by a Saopha. Its formal name was Dutawadi. For the state capital see Thibaw. 
 58 BC Sao Hkun Hkam Saw 1st 
 Sao Hkun Hkam Naw 2nd 
 Sao Hkun Hkam Hko 3rd
 165–201 Sao Hkun Hkam Pan  
 201–250 Paw Aik Phyao 9th 
 250–252 Awk Ai Lung 10th 
 Paw Pan (Sao Hpa Lung Hkam Pan) 11th
 Hso Pan Hpa 12th (son of Hso Hom Hpa, the saopha of Möng Mao
 957 Hkun Tai Hkam 
 1058 Hso Oom Hpa 38th 
 1395–1410 Nwe San Hpa 
 1410–1424 Sao Hkem Hpa  
 1424–1439 Hso Kawng Hpa 52th 
 1439–1460 Sao Hsan Hpa 
 1460–1473 Hkam Yat Hpa 
 1473–1488 Sao Yak Hpa 
 1488–1500 Hso Bok Hpa 
 1500–1541 Sao Tammara  
 1541–1542 Sao Hkun Naing (son of Sao Tammara) 
 1542–1547 Hso Yiam Hpa  
 1547–1565 Hso Klang Hpa 
 1565–1577 Hso Raem Hpa 
 1577–1593 Hso Kaw Hpa 62th (son of Sao Hkun Naing ex-saopha of Mongpai and ex-King Mobye Narapati of Ava) 
 1593–1605 Tap Hseng Hkam 
 1605–1626 Nga Hseng Möng (son of Hso Kaw Hpa) 
 1626–1650 Hkun Hkam Hlaing 65th (son of Tap Hseng Hkam) 
 1650–1675 Sao Hsen Tai  
 1675–1702 Hso Waing Hpa 
 1702–1714 Sao Okka Wara
 1714–1718 Sao Okka Seya
 1718–1722 Sao Sam Myo
 1722–1752 Sao Hkun Neng
 1752–1767 Sawra Tawta 
 1767–1788 Sao Myat San Te
 1788–1809 Sao Hswe Kya
 1809–1843 Sao Hkun Hkwi
 1843–1853 Sao Hkun Paw
 1853–1858 Sao Kya Htun (d. 1866)
 1858–1866 Hkun Myat Than 
 1866–1886 Sao Kya Hkeng	(deposed 1882-86) (d. 1902) 
 Mar 1886–8 May 1902 Sao Hkun Hseng
 8 May 1902–May 1928 Sao Hkun Hke (b. 1872 - d. 1928) (from 2 Jan 1928, Sir Sao Hke)
 1928–Jul 1938	I Sao Ohn Kya (b. 1893 - d. 1938)
 1938–1947 administered by British India
 1947–1959 Sao Kya Hseng (b. 1924 - d. 1962)

See also
Hsipaw Yazawin
Sino-Burmese War (1765–1769)

References

External links
"Gazetteer of Upper Burma and the Shan states"
The Imperial Gazetteer of India
Hsipaw (Shan State)
Twilight Over Burma: My Life As a Shan Princess

Shan States

ca:Hsipaw